Al-Judaydah, formerly Yeniyapan, is a village in northern Aleppo Governorate, northwestern Syria. Nearby localities include Dudiyan  to the northeast and Murayghil  to the south.

Demographics
In the 2004 census, al-Judaydah had a population of 63. In late 19th century, traveler Martin Hartmann noted Tal'ar as a Turkish and Arab (Bedouin) mixed village of 7 houses, then located in the Ottoman nahiyah of Azaz-i Turkman.

References

Populated places in Azaz District
Turkmen communities in Syria